Digital Broadcasting Corporation Hong Kong Limited (DBC), formerly known as Wave Media Limited, is a licensed independent digital audio broadcasting (DAB+) operator with most number of channels in Hong Kong. DBC was granted licence by the Hong Kong Broadcasting Authority in March 2011. There are currently four operators providing digital audio broadcasting services with a total of 18 channels. Being the largest digital broadcaster in the territory, DBC operates 7 channels. Major shareholder of DBC is Bill Wong. Board of directors are Arthur Li, Ambrose Lee Siu-kwong and Loh Chan.

In summer 2012, DBC underwent a period of corporate dispute, leading the station to closure. Albert Cheng said shareholder Bill Wong had refused to invest more funds after receiving instructions from an unnamed official at the Central Government's Liaison Office in Hong Kong. The radio station announced its closure on 10 October 2012. On 19 October 2012, activists and radio hosts began a three-day sit-in protest in front of the government headquarters in Admiralty.

On 20 December 2013, DBC held its grand re-launch. Calling an end to the previous corporate dispute was the restructuring of board of directors. Albert Cheng is no longer a shareholder of nor a host in DBC.

DBC decided to close and return its operating licence to the government with effect from 7 September 2016 affecting 113 staff, because the digital audio broadcasting was not popular, and it did not receive enough advertisement to support the revenue.

Channels

DBC 1 Radio Prime 

Weekday Program
Morning Octopus() Monday to Saturday 0730–1000
All Time Happy() Monday to Sunday 1000–1300
Up High The Sky() Monday to Friday 1300–1500; Saturday 1300–1600
Career Boom!() Monday to Friday, 1500–1700
DBC Home() Monday to Friday 1700–2000
Music Dessert() Monday to Friday 2000–2100
My Heart Will Go On() Monday to Friday 2100–2300
Night Still Young() Monday to Friday 2300–0100

Saturday Program 
The World on Stage Saturday 1300–1500
Afternoon DelightSaturday 1500–1800
Hi End Music Show Saturday and Sunday 1800–1900
AV fanatics Saturday and Sunday 1900–2100
AhVMusicSaturday and Sunday 2100–2200
Love Beyond Limits() Saturday 2200–2400

Sunday Program
Entertainment Report Sunday 1300–1500
Beautiful Mission Sunday 1500–1600
Pets Sweet Pets Sunday 1600–1700
The Eco War Sunday 1700–1800
Music Live Show Saturday and Sunday 2100-0000

DBC 2 Radio News 

Morning News 0600-0730
Morning News and Traffic Updates 0730-1000
Morning News (Hong Kong, International, China, Taiwan) 1000–1200
Afternoon News Monday to Friday 1200–1230
Afternoon News and Traffic Updates Monday to Friday 1230–1400
Afternoon News Saturday to Sunday 1230–1400
Afternoon News 1400–1600
News (Hong Kong, International, Finance) 1600–1800
Evening News and Traffic Updates Monday to Sunday 1800–2000
Evening News (Hong Kong, International Headline) 2000–2300
News Roundup (Hong Kong, International, Peripheral Stock Exchange) 2300-0100
Midnight News 0100-0600

DBC 3 Radio Finance 
Weekdays
Countdown to the Morning Bell 0830-0930
Markets Now (Morning)() 0930-1200
News 1200–1300
Markets Now (Afternoon)() 1300–1600
After the Bell 1600–1800
News 1800–2030
Wall Street at Cyberport 2030–2100
Moves with Fire 2100–2200
10 Things You Need to Know 2200–2230

DBC 4 Radio Campus 
Weekdays
Happy Parents Monday to Sunday 08:30–0900
Active Elite 0900–1000
Campus Parade 1000–1200;1900–2100
Liberal Tone 1200–1400
8910 Campus 1400–1600
Super Classroom 1600–1800
DBC Campus DJ Monday to Sunday 1800–1900
My Heart Will Go On 2100-0000

Saturday
Talk to Heroes 0900-1000
Study Overseas 1000–1200;1900–2100
Ears Travellers 1200–1400
Digital Sports News 1400–1600
Family Doctor 1600–1800
To Sir With Love 2100–2200
Love Tutorial 2200-0000

Sunday
Beating the unbeatable 0900-1000
U Station 1000–1200;1900–2100
Green Discovery 1200–1400
Sing Out the Real Me 1400–1600
To Students With Love 2100–2200
Voice of Books 2200-000

DBC 5 Radio Smiles 

Filipino:
Pinoy Fuse: Tuesday and Thursday 18:00–21:00 (Replay: Wednesday and Friday 1100–1400
Tsikahan Sa Hong Kong: Monday and Saturday 2000–2300 (Replay: Tuesday and Sunday 1500–1800)
Radyo Migrante: Thursday 2100–2300 (Replay: Friday 1500–1700)
Pinoy Tambayan: Sunday 2000–2200 (Replay: Monday 1500–1700)

Indonesian
Nongkrong Bareng: Wednesday 2000–2300 (Replay: Thursday and Saturday 1500–1800; Sunday 0900-1500)
Selamat Malam Sobat Migran: Tuesday 2100–2300 (Replay: Wednesday 1500–1700)
Kumpul Bareng: Sunday 2200-0000 (Replay: Monday 1700–1900)

Korean
Super K-Pop Monday 1100–1500; Weekdays 2300-0100
(Broadcast Arirang radio program)

DBC 6 Radio Music 
Weekdays
In the Wee Small Hours: Monday 0600-0900
Featured Picks: 0900-1300
Popular Classics: 1300–1600
逸樂生活館: 1600–1800
師妹揀首新歌: 1800–1900
揀首男女: 1900–2000
音樂 DNA: 2000–2100
愛與樂飛行: 2100–2300
夜空傳情: 2300-0100
抒情夜曲: 0100-0600

DBC 7 Radio Opera 

Canton Opera
Monday to Friday 0400-0900;1100–2300
Saturday and Sunday 0700-1200;1400–2300

Chaozhou
Monday to Friday 0900-1100
Saturday and Sunday 1200–1400

Angel Ching Time
Monday to Friday 1200–1400
Monday to Friday (Replay) 2300-0100

Opera Mix
Monday to Sunday 1900–2100
Saturday and Sunday 0600-0900

Shanghai Shaoxing Opera
Monday to Sunday 2100–2300
Saturday and Sunday 2300-0000

Chinese Traditional Music
Monday to Sunday 0100-0300
Saturday and Sunday 0000-0100

Peking Opera
Monday to Sunday 0300-0600

References

External links
 Digital Broadcasting Corporation Hong Kong

Radio stations in Hong Kong
2008 establishments in Hong Kong
2016 disestablishments in Hong Kong